Australia has participated in 33 of 81 Ice Hockey World Championships, an annual ice hockey tournament organised by the International Ice Hockey Federation (IIHF). Australia first participated in 1962 where they were placed in Pool B and finished the tournament in 13th, only ahead of Denmark. Following a 12-year absence from the tournament Australia rejoined and participated in Pool C for the 1974 championships. Throughout the next three decades Australia moved between Pool C and Pool D due to the relegation system in place. Starting in 2001 the IIHF implemented a new system of grouping in which Australia was placed in Division II. As of 2017 Australia are competing in Division II Group A having gained promotion in 2016 from Division II Group B. Ice Hockey Australia is responsible for the Australian team roster and operations.

Key

Goaltenders

Skaters

References
General

Specific

External links
 Ice Hockey Australia – Official website

Australia
Australia men's national ice hockey team